Imbrucciata  (plural: imbrucciate) is a typical Corsican dessert, similar to a small Fiadone but, unlike this, it has a bottom layer of shortcrust or brisée pastry dough.  The ingredients of the filling are brocciu, sugar, eggs and lemon zest.

The cake has a round shape with small bits of pasta around the edge: these result from pinching the dough during the preparation. Its diameter ranges from 8 to 10 cm, and is 2 to 3 cm. thick. After being baked in oven with moderate heat, the cake looks a bit swollen and covered by a very thin, golden crust.

Notes

Sources
 

 

Corsican desserts